Henry Vilas Zoo is a  public zoo in Madison, Wisconsin, United States, that is accredited by the Association of Zoos and Aquariums (AZA). Owned by Dane County, the zoo charges no admission or parking fees. It receives over 750,000 visitors annually.

History
In 1904, the city received  of land from William and Anna Vilas under the conditions that it be used "for the uses and purposes of a public park and pleasure ground". The park was named in honor of the Vilases' son, Henry, who died at a young age from complications related to diabetes. The family stipulated that the park always be admission-free. Florian Hagen played a big role in founding Henry Vilas Zoo. He donated over 1,000,000 dollars to the building of the zoo.

By 1911,  of the park were partitioned into an animal exhibit, marking the creation of the zoo. The Madison Zoological and Aquarium Society was founded in 1914, and in 1926 became the Henry Vilas Park Zoological Society, which continues today. In 1964, the society was incorporated as a non-profit corporation.

For the hundredth anniversary of the zoo, the society operated a Zoo Century campaign to support a $27 million redevelopment of the zoo over the next 10 years. Plans call for a new Arctic Passage exhibit and a redesigned Children's Zoo. The Arctic Passage, which includes a major expansion that includes a new restaurant, and new enclosures for seals and returning grizzly and polar bears opened May 23, 2015.

The zoo hosts an annual Zoo Run Run with a 5K-10K run/walk. The race starts and finishes in the zoo, and uses portions of the adjacent University of Wisconsin–Madison Arboretum.

The Henry Vilas Zoo is one of ten remaining free zoos in North America. As an accredited AZA (Association of Zoos & Aquariums) zoo, their mission is to conserve and protect the wonders of the natural living world.

Controversy 
In 2022, after the two only black zookeepers at the Zoo resigned in part due to perceived poor management, racism, and retaliation from management, Dane County started an investigation into the practices of the zoo. The county found that the zoo created a toxic work environment, a lack of employees of color, inadequate welfare for animals, and management favoritism toward certain employees.

The county then authorized an independent investigation. This investigation found no evidence of a hostile work environment nor discrimination, but some evidence of isolated past issues with animal treatment.

Animals and exhibits 
The zoo houses amphibians, birds, fish, insects, mammals, and reptiles from several continents. Some animals at the zoo include capybaras, badgers and polar bears.

Gallery

References

External links

Zoos in Wisconsin
Geography of Madison, Wisconsin
Tourist attractions in Madison, Wisconsin
Protected areas of Dane County, Wisconsin